Cristian Gabriel García (born 22 July 1996) is an Argentine professional footballer who plays as a midfielder for Guillermo Brown.

Career
García began his career with CAI. He made twelve appearances in the 2015 Torneo Federal A campaign, in which he was sent off three times including in the relegation play-off against Gutiérrez on 30 October as the club were relegated to Torneo Federal B. He then made twenty-seven appearances and scored once in the fourth tier across three seasons. On 30 June 2018, García joined Primera B Nacional side Guillermo Brown. His professional league debut subsequently arrived during a home defeat to Brown in August, having made his club bow in the Copa Argentina over Tigre in the prior month.

Career statistics
.

References

External links

1996 births
Living people
Argentine footballers
Argentine expatriate footballers
Sportspeople from Mendoza Province
Association football midfielders
Torneo Federal A players
Primera Nacional players
Ecuadorian Serie A players
Comisión de Actividades Infantiles footballers
Guillermo Brown footballers
Delfín S.C. footballers
Argentine expatriate sportspeople in Ecuador
Expatriate footballers in Ecuador